The Glynmill Inn is a hotel and historic structure located in Corner Brook, Newfoundland and Labrador.

History 

The Glynmill Inn was designed and built in 1923 by the prominent Atlantic Canadian architect Andrew Cobb. Originally constructed to house employees and senior staff during the construction of the paper mill in Corner Brook, it was converted into a hotel in 1925.

Architecturally, the Glynmill Inn has been recognized as a prominent example of the Tudor Revival style in Newfoundland. In 1974, an additional wing was built onto the rear of the building.

The Inn has played a prominent role in the history of Corner Brook, both architecturally and culturally. In 2001, it was recognized as a Heritage Structure in Newfoundland and Labrador.

References

External links
 Official website

Buildings and structures in Newfoundland and Labrador